Raul Jorge da Silva (born 18 November 1903, date of death unknown) was a Portuguese footballer who played as forward.

References

External links 
 
 

1903 births
Portuguese footballers
Association football forwards
Portugal international footballers
Year of death missing